The Steinbeis Foundation is an institute headquartered in Stuttgart, Germany dedicated to the transfer of academic findings and knowledge into the field of business. Established in its current form in 1971, the foundation encompasses the Steinbeis-Hochschule Berlin, hundreds of Steinbeis Transfer Centres and Transfer Institutes which operate as stand-alone profit centres. Many are based at German universities of dual education and applied sciences under the directorship of professors who also use the Steinbeis network to attract funding from industry into academic research and study.

History

The Steinbeis Foundation was founded by the State of Baden-Württemberg based on a concept first developed by its patron Ferdinand von Steinbeis (1807-1893). Von Steinbeis set up a variety of vocational colleges in Baden-Württemberg aimed at fostering dual education.

Investments

In 2019, Steinbeis Foundation invested in Teylor, a Swiss-based a digital loan platform and developer of digital financial products and services for the financial services industry.

Turnover

Steinbeis turnover in 2008 totalled 124 million euros generated by a network of 765 Transfer Centres or Research Centres, Advice Centres or Transfer Institutes.

See also

 Baden-Württemberg Cooperative State University

References

External links 
 Steinbeis foundation web site

Foundations based in Germany
Steinbeis-Hochschule Berlin
Organisations based in Stuttgart
Scientific organizations established in 1868
1868 establishments in Germany